Květa Legátová, born Věra Hofmanová (3 November 1919 – 22 December 2012) was a Czech novelist and writer whose work spanned a period from the 1950s to the 2000s. Her best known work, a 2001 collection of short stories and essays entitled "Želary," and her 2002 book, "Jozova Hanule," were adapted into the 2003 film, Želary. The film received an 2004 Academy Award nomination in the Best Foreign Language Film.

Born in Podolí, Legátová died on 22 December 2012 at the age of 93.

Bibliography 
Korda Dabrová (1961) – childbook
Želary (2001) – short stories
Jozova Hanule (2002) – novel
Návraty do Želar (2005)
Nic není tak prosté (2006)

References

1919 births
2012 deaths
Czech women novelists
20th-century Czech novelists
20th-century women writers
Czechoslovak writers
People from Brno-Country District